The Korea American Football Association (KAFA, Korean: 대한미식축구협회, Hanja: 大韓美式蹴球協會) has existed in South Korea for more than 70 years.  The popularity of American football in Korea has been historically low, but with the visit of Hines Ward (a Korean born NFL football star with the Pittsburgh Steelers) in 2006, the sport received a modest level of increased appeal. Within Korea, KAFA is a sports governing body over both traditional football with pads and also flag football.

Traditional football leagues within Korea is divided between university and senior (KNFL) teams.  Three championship bowl games of special note occur at the end of the season. The Tiger Bowl determines the champions of the University league, the Gwanggaeto Bowl determines the champions of the KNFL, and finally, the Kimchi Bowl, the Korean equivalent of Japan's Rice Bowl, pits the University champion against the KNFL champion.

College Programs

Korea National Football League 

In 2015, there were seven teams in the KNFL, divided into two divisions (북부리그 North Division, 남부리그 South Division).  The top two seeds of each division played in a four-team semifinal playoff.  Winners of the semifinals played in the Gwanggaeto Bowl Championship. The KNFL Champion played the Korean University League Champion in the Kimchi Bowl.

Starting in 2016, the KNFL changed to a full league format, with each of the seven teams playing one another. The two teams with the best regular season records face off in the Gwanggaeto Bowl. The KNFL Champion plays the Korean University League Champion in the Kimchi Bowl.

Seoul Golden Eagles
Seoul Carnivores (Sponsored by Seoul National University OB)
Seoul Vikings
Daegu Phoenix
Samsung Geoje Blue Storm
Busan Gryphons
KS Bluegons (Sponsored by KyungSung University OB)

Gwanggaeto Bowl Finals

Tiger Bowl 

The Tiger Bowl is an annual college football bowl game played in South Korea established in 1994. The game is the championship game for the KFAF's college programs.

Finals

Kimchi Bowl
The Kimchi Bowl is the final championship game of KAFA. The game pits the KNFL team that has won the Gwanggaeto Bowl against the university team that has won the Tiger bowl.

Finials

See also
 South Korea national American football team
 International Federation of American Football (IFAF)
 IFAF Asia

References

External links
  KAFA Official website
 Seoul Golden Eagles Official Website
  Seoul Vikings Official Website
 Daegu Phoenix Official Website
  Samsung Geoje Blue Storm Official Website
  Busan Gryphons Official Website

American football in South Korea
American football governing bodies
American football leagues

Sports governing bodies in South Korea
Sports organizations established in 1945
Asian Federation of American Football
1945 establishments in Korea